Madhubaanakadai is a 2012 Tamil-language sociopolitical satire film, directed by debutant director Kamalakannan and produced by Montage Media Productions. The story of the movie is based on the TASMAC shop, which has real-life drunkards in leading roles. Actor Rafeeq played the male lead role and Ishwarya played the female lead and both are new faces to Kollywood. The film was released on 2 August 2012 and received mixed reviews.

Cast
Rafeeq
Iswarya
 Karthi Vel
 Dhyana
 Arvind Annamalai
 Ramu
 N. T. Rajkumar as Mani
 Ravi
 Paruthi
 Rajan Bala

Development
This movie is a story of Liquior shop with bar attached. Feelings will be before going to the Liquor shop and after consuming coming out of the bar and its in & out matters. A film is not encouraging to have drinks and not to have drinks and no lesson out of it. It is only in and outs of the liquor shop according to the Director Kamalakannan.

A small village and a Kalyana Mantap was made as a liquor shop attached with a bar and local peoples been engaged in that and asked them to stay there for twenty days and all shots taken there and night itself editing ad shown to them with the training given to them as per Kamlakannan, director of the Movie. Cameraman Sumee Baskaran handled canon 7D camera and shots has come out excellent as per his speeches.

Soundtrack

The Music was composed by Ved Shankar and Released on Junglee Music.

See also
List of Tamil films of 2012

References

External links
 

2012 comedy films
2012 films
Films about social issues in India
2010s Tamil-language films
Films scored by Ved Shankar
Indian comedy films